Nordenskjöld Glacier is a large glacier in South Georgia.

The glacier flows north and has its terminus at the head of Cumberland East Bay, on the north coast of the island. It was charted by the Swedish Antarctic Expedition and named after Otto Nordenskjöld, leader of the expedition. Sheridan Peak sits near the glacier's head.

See also
 List of glaciers in the Antarctic
 Glaciology

References

External links
 Photograph of the terminal face of the glacier

Glaciers of South Georgia